Eland may refer to:

Animals
Taurotragus, a genus of antelope
 Common eland of East and Southern Africa
 Giant eland of Central and Western Africa

Places
 Eland, Wisconsin, United States
 An old spelling of Elland, West Yorkshire
 Eland Mountains, Antarctica
 Elands River (disambiguation)
 Elands, New South Wales

Businesses
 Eland Books, a publishing house
 Eland Oil & Gas, a Nigeria-focused upstream oil and natural gas exploration and production company
 E-Land Group, a South Korean conglomerate

Technology
 Eland Mk7, a South African armoured car
 Napier Eland, a type of turboshaft

Other uses
 Eland (surname)
 Eland House, an office building in Westminster, London
 Operation Eland, a 1976 attack by Rhodesian Selous Scouts at Nyadzonya, Mozambique

See also
 Elan (disambiguation)
 Elaan (disambiguation)

Animal common name disambiguation pages